Prayidae is a family of marine invertebrates in the order Siphonophorae. They are colonial, and the colonies can superficially resemble jellyfish; although they appear to be a single organism, each specimen is actually a colony of Siphonophora.

The family contains the following subfamilies and genera:

 Subfamily Amphicaryoninae Chun, 1888
 Genus Amphicaryon Chun, 1888
 Genus Maresearsia Totton, 1954
 Subfamily Nectopyramidinae Bigelow, 1911
 Genus Nectadamas Pugh, 1992
 Genus Nectopyramis Bigelow, 1911
 Subfamily Prayinae Chun, 1885
 Genus Craseoa Pugh & Harbison, 1987
 Genus Desmophyes Haeckel, 1888
 Genus Gymnopraia Haddock, Dunn & Pugh, 2005
 Genus Lilyopsis Chun, 1885
 Genus Mistoprayina Pugh & Harbison, 1987
 Genus Praya Quoy & Gaimard, in de Blainville, 1834
 Genus Prayola Carré, C. 1969
 Genus Rosacea Quoy & Gaimard, 1827
 Genus Stephanophyes Chun, 1888

References

 
Calycophorae
Cnidarian families